Wong Yi Chau is the name of a village and of an island in the Sai Kung District of Hong Kong. The village is located on the mainland, facing the island of the same name.

 Wong Yi Chau (island)
 Wong Yi Chau (village)